Hygienic Productions was a film production company based out of Wilmington, Ohio.  Formed by exploitation film producer Kroger Babb, the company was in charge of promotion and production for a number of Babb's films, including the infamous Mom and Dad.

Later, following the success of Mom and Dad, Babb would rename the company to a more general name, Hallmark Productions, and later, the "Hallmark Big-6."  They would continue presenting the sexual education and medical-style films, but expand to more genres, including drug message films such as "She Shoulda Said 'No'!" and shock films like Karamoja.

References

 Variety: "Babb, 5 Others Form New Indie Distribution Outfit." 23 May, approx. 1960.
 A Youth in Babylon: Confessions of a Trash-Film King, David F. Friedman. Prometheus Books, 1990.

Film production companies of the United States